Ahmet Toçoğlu (born 13 March 1980 in Sakarya) is a Turkish volleyball player of Fenerbahçe Grundig.  He graduated as a Physical Education and Sports Teacher from Sakarya University. He plays as middle hitter and is 2.01 min in height. Since the 2007-08 season to 2011-12, he has played for Arkas Spor Izmir and wears the number 3. He has played 240 times for the national team as well as playing for Arçelik, Erdemirspor, Ziraat Bankası and Halk Bankası.  
CEV (Challenge Cup) Champions 2009

References

External links
 Player profile at arkasspor.com
 Fenerbajçe Volleyball

1980 births
Living people
Turkish men's volleyball players
Arçelik volleyballers
Arkas Spor volleyball players
Fenerbahçe volleyballers
Sakarya University alumni
Volleyball players at the 2015 European Games
European Games competitors for Turkey